Little Blacknose: The Story of a Pioneer is a children's book published in 1929. Written by Hildegarde Swift, the book received the Newbery Honor award for the year 1930.

The book tells the story of the DeWitt Clinton locomotive, the first steam locomotive to operate in New York.

1929 children's books
Newbery Honor-winning works
Children's history books
20th-century history books
History books about the United States
Children's books about rail transport